Govert Jacob Willem Brasser (born 24 April 1957, in The Hague) is a sailor from the Netherlands.  Since the Netherlands did boycott the Moscow Olympic Games Brasser represented his National Olympic Committee at the 1980 Summer Olympics, which was boycotted by several countries, in Tallinn, USSR under the Dutch NOC flag. With Willem van Walt Meijer as helmsman, Brasser took the 5th place in the Tornado.

Sources
 
 
 
 
 
 
 
 

Living people
1956 births
Sportspeople from The Hague
Dutch male sailors (sport)

Sailors at the 1980 Summer Olympics – Tornado
Olympic sailors of the Netherlands